The Amari Valley is a fertile valley on the foothills of Mount Ida and Mount Kedros in Crete. The valley was known as a center of resistance to the Germans during the Battle of Crete and the German occupation. After the abduction of General Heinrich Kreipe the Germans destroyed a number of villages in the area, killing many of their inhabitants.

Prehistory
The ancient city of Phaistos expanded with satellite development into the Amari Valley in the late Bronze Age, establishing a settlement at Monastiraki.

See also
Phaistos
Holocaust of Kedros

References
 C. Michael Hogan. 2007. C.Michael Hogan, Phaistos Fieldnotes, The Modern Antiquarian
 John D. Pendlebury. 1991. The Archaeology of Crete, Biblo & Tannen Publishers,

Line notes

Valleys of Greece
Landforms of Crete
Landforms of Rethymno (regional unit)